Navia lasiantha is a plant species in the genus Navia. This species is endemic to Venezuela.

References

lasiantha
Flora of Venezuela